Chitrakoot Assembly constituency is one of the 230 Vidhan Sabha (Legislative Assembly) constituencies of Madhya Pradesh state in central India.

Members of Legislative Assembly

See also
 Chitrakoot, Madhya Pradesh

References

Assembly constituencies of Madhya Pradesh